The TransJakarta Corridor 9 is the TransJakarta bus rapid transit corridor that operates from the Pinang Ranti Terminal to the Pluit BRT Station. The streets traversed by corridor 9 are Jalan Pluit Putri/Putra, Jalan Jembatan Tiga, Jalan Prof Dr.  Latumeten, Jalan Satria/Prof. Dr. Makaliwe, Jalan Letjen S. Parman, Jalan Jend. Gatot Subroto, MT Haryono Street, Mayjen Sutoyo Street, Jagorawi Toll Road, and Pondok Gede Raya Street. Corridor 9 is integrated with the KAI Commuter Bogor Line service at the Cikoko Stasiun Cawang BRT Station that connects to the Cawang railway station and the Tangerang Line at the Latumeten Stasiun Grogol BRT Station that connects to the Grogol railway station on Jalan Satria/Prof. Dr. Makaliwe, and will be integrated with the Jabodebek LRT from the BNN BRT Station to West Pancoran. Starting from the Latumeten Stop at Grogol Station to the BNN BRT Station, this route is adjacent to the Cawang-Tomang-Pluit Toll Road as the part of the Jakarta Inner Ring Road. This corridor is also the longest route among other Transjakarta corridor routes. The total length of this route is 28.8 KM, and it crosses 5 administrative cities of the Special Capital Region of Jakarta province, namely North Jakarta, West Jakarta, Central Jakarta, South Jakarta and East Jakarta.

Corridor 9, along with Corridor 10 began service on December 31, 2010 to support the 2011 Southeast Asian Games.

Starting June 1, 2014, Corridor 9 along with corridor 1 and 3 began to operate 24 hours a day (AMARI), with buses only stopping at certain BRT Stations. Starting in February 2016 until today, AMARI Night Corridor M9 stops at all BRT Stations without exception. The average distance between BRT stations is 650 meters.

List of BRT Stations 
 Currently, all bus stops are served by buses 24 hours a day.
 *) Bendungan Hilir to Semanggi bus stop via skywalk bridge which is maybe too steep for disable person and takes at least 10 minutes walk.
 Italic text indicates that the BRT Station is clsoed for renovation.

Cross-corridor routes

Corridor 9A (PGC 2–Grogol 2–Pluit) 
 *) Bendungan Hilir to Semanggi bus stop via skywalk bridge which is maybe too steep for disable person and takes at least 10 minutes walk.
 Italic text indicates that the BRT Station is clsoed for renovation.

Corridor 9B (Pinang Ranti–Kota) 

 Only operates at weekdays (Monday-Friday) and closed on public holidays.
 Stations indicated by a -> sign has a one way service towards Kota only.
 *) Bendungan Hilir to Semanggi bus stop via skywalk bridge which is maybe too steep for disable person and takes at least 10 minutes walk.
 Italic text indicates that the BRT Station is clsoed for renovation or the bus do not stop at the station.

Corridor 9C (Pinang Ranti–Bundaran Senayan) 
 Stations indicated by a <- sign has a one way service towards Pinang Ranti only.
 *) Bendungan Hilir to Semanggi bus stop via skywalk bridge which is maybe too steep for disable person and takes at least 10 minutes walk.
 Italic text indicates that the BRT Station is clsoed for renovation or the bus do not stop at the station.

Corridor 9M (Pancoran Barat–Latuharhari)

Corridor 9K (Kampung Rambutan–Grogol 2)

Fleets 

 Zhongtong Bus LCK6180GC, red-yellow, special livery for Earth Day and Indonesian Independence day (TJ)
 Zhongtong Bus LCK6180GC Euro 5, white-dark blue (PPD)
 Scania K320IA CNG Euro VI, white-light blue (MB)
 Hino RK8 R260, blue (BMP, night bus (22:00 - 05:00) (Pluit-PGC 2)))
 Yutong ZK6180HGC, orange-red (TJ)
 Ankai HFF6180G02D, orange-red (TJ)
 Mercedes-Benz OH 1526 NG, white-pink (TJ, special bus for womens (only operates at corridor 9A))
 Mercedes-Benz OH 1626 NG OM906LA A/T, white-dark blue (MYS)
 Scania K310IB 6x2, white-blue (MYS)
 Volvo B11R 6×2 A/T, white-blue (SAF)
 Hino RK8 R260, blue (PPD)

Depots 

 Klender (MB)
 Cijantung (MYS)
 Cawang (TJ (Corridor 9A))
 Pesing (TJ (Corridor 9))
 Cawang (PPD)
 Pulo Gadung (PPD)
 Ciputat (PPD)
 Klender (PPD)
 Klender (SAF)
 Pinang Ranti (TJ)

See also

TransJakarta
List of TransJakarta corridors

References

External links 
 https://transjakarta.co.id/peta-rute/

Bus routes
TransJakarta